Jochen Tilk served as the Executive Chairman of Nutrien from 2014 to 2018.  He was President and CEO of PotashCorp from July 1, 2014 until its merger with Agrium to form Nutrien.  Previously he served as CEO of Inmet Mining Corporation, a Canadian metals company with operations in Turkey, Finland, Spain, and development in Panama, between 2009 and 2013.  He is also the former Chair of Petaquilla Copper Limited. He currently serves on the Boards of Durectors of Emera, AngloGold Ashanti Limited and the Princess Margaret Cancer Foundation  

During his 24 years at Inmet, Tilk, through asset optimization, organic growth and strategic acquisitions, grew Inmet into a $5 billion-plus enterprise, and led capital expenditure programs of approximately US$7 billion with new mine developments in Spain and Central America.  Inmet's facilities were recognized as leaders in quality and cost.

References

Canadian chief executives
Living people
Year of birth missing (living people)